Laam or LAAM may refer to:
 Lââm, (born 1971), French female singer of Tunisian descent
 La'am,, a former political faction in Israel
 Lamane, the landed gentry as well the title of ancient kings of the Serer people
 Levacetylmethadol, a synthetic opioid similar in structure to methadone
 lām, a letter in the Arabic alphabet
 3d LAAM Bn, a United States Marine Corps air defense unit